is a Japanese wheelchair fencer.

Hisakawa began wheelchair fencing in 1997 after a spinal cord injury. He participated in the 1998, 1999, and 2000 Wheelchair Fencing World Cups as well as the 1999 FESPIC Games in Bangkok. He has represented Japan at three editions of the Summer Paralympic Games, in 2000, 2004, and 2008, each time competing in both foil B and épée B events.

References

External links
 

Year of birth missing (living people)
Living people
Japanese male foil fencers
Paralympic wheelchair fencers of Japan
Wheelchair fencers at the 2000 Summer Paralympics
Wheelchair fencers at the 2004 Summer Paralympics
Wheelchair fencers at the 2008 Summer Paralympics
Japanese male épée fencers
20th-century Japanese people
21st-century Japanese people